Carla Juaçaba (born 1976) is a Brazilian architect. She won the first arcVision Prize, an international award for women in architecture.

Early life and education
She was born in Rio de Janeiro and received a bachelor's degree in architecture and urbanism from Universidade Santa Úrsula and then continued with post-graduate studies in structure at the Pontifical Catholic University of Rio de Janeiro. She has since taught at the Pontifical Catholic University. In 2000, she set up her own architecture practice. Juaçaba works on both public and private sector projects, mainly working on residential and cultural projects. She has worked with architect Gisela Magalhães on a number of projects related to museums starting from the time when she was an undergraduate. She has lectured at the Harvard Graduate School of Design, at the University of Toronto and the school of architecture at Columbia University.

Career
The jury for the arcVision prize was particularly impressed by her work on the Humanidade Pavilion 2012, created for the United Nations Conference on Sustainable Development. The jury found that she possessed "creativity in seeking unconventional solutions and enormous sensitivity to the context in which her works will reside". In 2014, she was nominated for a Schelling Architecture Award.

Juaçaba was selected to design a chapel which would be part of the Vatican's pavilion at the 2018 Venice Biennale of Architecture. In 2022 she realized "Fil d'Air" an in-situ installation for the Open House exhibition about temporary housing held in Geneva.

References

External links 
 

1976 births
Living people
Brazilian architects
People from Rio de Janeiro (city)
Pontifical Catholic University of Rio de Janeiro alumni
Universidade Santa Úrsula alumni
Brazilian women architects